Orco is an Italian river.

Orco may also refer to:
ORCO, French real estate development company
Orco Valley (Italian: Valle dell'Orco), is a valley in the Piedmont region of northern Italy located in the Graian Alps
Orco Feglino, comune in the Province of Savona in the Italian region Liguria
Odorant receptor co-receptor (Or83b), also known as Orco

See also 
Orko (disambiguation)
Orcus (disambiguation)
Oreco (1932–1985)